Carlos Alberto Méndez Castillo (born June 18, 1974) is a former Major League Baseball first baseman/designated hitter and right-handed batter.

In 26 games, Méndez batted .222 (10-for-45), with five RBI, three runs and three doubles.

He is currently the hitting coach for the AA Mississippi Braves.

See also
 List of Major League Baseball players from Venezuela

External links

Retrosheet
The Baseball Gauge
Venezuela Winter League

1974 births
Living people
Aberdeen IronBirds players
Baltimore Orioles players
Gulf Coast Royals players
Leones del Caracas players
Major League Baseball first basemen
Major League Baseball players from Venezuela
Minor league baseball coaches
Omaha Golden Spikes players
Omaha Royals players
Ottawa Lynx players
Baseball players from Caracas
Richmond Braves players
Rockford Royals players
Sacramento River Cats players
Toledo Mud Hens players
Venezuelan baseball coaches
Venezuelan expatriate baseball players in Canada
Venezuelan expatriate baseball players in the United States
Wichita Wranglers players
Wilmington Blue Rocks players